Winterhaven (formerly, Karmack) is a census-designated place (CDP) in Imperial County, California. It is part of the El Centro, CA Metropolitan Area. North of Interstate 8 and bordering Yuma, Arizona, the town is partly in the Fort Yuma Indian Reservation. The Colorado River marks the town's southern border.

Telephone and mail service 
Telephone service is provided by Winterhaven Telephone Company, a subsidiary of TDS Telecom, and wired telephones in the area have numbers following the format (760) 572-xxxx. These numbers are assigned to subscribers in Winterhaven, Bard, and Felicity.

The communities of Bard and Felicity appear in the US Geological Survey, National Geographic Names Database, and the US Postal Service database and adjoin the community of Winterhaven. The communities of Felicity and Winterhaven share a ZIP code: 92283. Bard does not have postal delivery, and post office boxes for the community have a ZIP code of 92222.

The first post office at Winterhaven operated from 1916 to 1921. It was re-established in 1934.

Geography
Winterhaven is the southeasternmost settlement in California.

Climate
This area has a large amount of sunshine year round due to its stable descending air and high pressure. According to the Köppen Climate Classification system, Winterhaven has a desert climate, abbreviated "Bwh" on climate maps.

Demographics

2010
The 2010 census reported that Winterhaven had a population of 394. The racial makeup was 245 (62.2%) White, 4 (1.0%) African American, 37 (9.4%) Native American, 4 (0.3%) Asian, 0 (0.0%) Pacific Islander, 84 (21.3%) from other races, and 23 (5.8%) from two or more races. Hispanic or Latino of any race were 261 people (66.2%).

The whole population lived in households, no one lived in non-institutionalized group quarters and no one was institutionalized.

There were 151 households, 59 (39.1%) had children under the age of 18 living in them, 53 (35.1%) were opposite-sex married couples living together, 34 (22.5%) had a female householder with no husband present, 10 (6.6%) had a male householder with no wife present. There were 11 (7.3%) unmarried opposite-sex partnerships, and 1 (0.7%) same-sex married couples or partnerships. 48 households (31.8%) were one person and 27 (17.9%) had someone living alone who was 65 or older. The average household size was 2.61. There were 97 families (64.2% of households); the average family size was 3.30.

The population was spread out, with 116 people (29.4%) under the age of 18, 39 people (9.9%) aged 18 to 24, 63 people (16.0%) aged 25 to 44, 110 people (27.9%) aged 45 to 64, and 66 people (16.8%) who were 65 or older. The median age was 39.0 years. For every 100 females, there were 86.7 males. For every 100 females age 18 and over, there were 91.7 males.

There were 186 housing units at an average density of ,of which 151 were occupied, 62 (41.1%) by the owners and 89 (58.9%) by renters.  The homeowner vacancy rate was 3.1%; the rental vacancy rate was 8.1%. 154 people (39.1% of the population) lived in owner-occupied housing units and 240 people (60.9%) lived in rental housing units.

2000
At the 2000 census there were 529 people, 183 households, and 118 families in the CDP. The racial makup of the CDP was 45.6% White, 3.0% Black or African American, 6.8% Native American, 0.4% Asian, 38.4% from other races, and 5.9% from two or more races. 56.3%. were Hispanic or Latino of any race.

There were 183 households, out of which 38.3% had children under the age of 18 living with them, 41.5% were married couples living together, 19.1% had a female householder with no husband present, and 35.0% were non-families. 32.8% of households were one person, and 19.7% were one person aged 65 or older. The average household size was 2.9 and the average family size was 3.7.

The age distribution was 35.0% under the age of 18, 8.9% from 18 to 24, 21.2% from 25 to 44, 18.5% from 45 to 64, and 16.4% 65 or older. The median age was 31 years. For every 100 females, there were 98.1 males. For every 100 females age 18 and over, there were 95.5 males.

The median household income was $11,563 and the median income for a family was $16,417. Males had a median income of $26,458 versus $20,750 for females. The per capita income for the CDP was $7,220. About 41.9% of families and 47.1% of the population were below the poverty line, including 60.4% of those under age 18 and 13.9% of those age 65 or over.

Politics

Government
The Winterhaven County Water District provides water service to Winterhaven.

Sites of interest
 Museum of History in Granite

Nearby 
 Felicity, California
 Yuma, Arizona
 Los Algodones, Baja California
 Chocolate Mountains

See also
 San Diego–Imperial, California

References

External links
County of Imperial,California 
County of Yuma, Arizona

 
Census-designated places in Imperial County, California
Populated places in the Sonoran Desert
Communities in the Lower Colorado River Valley
Census-designated places in California
California populated places on the Colorado River